TMHS may refer to:
 Tallinn Music High School, Tallinn, Estonia
 Temple Moor High School, Leeds, West Yorkshire, England
 Tewksbury Memorial High School, Tewksbury, Massachusetts, United States
 The Magic Hockey Skates
 Tomball Memorial High School, Harris County, Texas, United States
 Thunder Mountain High School, Juneau, Alaska, United States
 Thurgood Marshall High School (disambiguation)
 Tussey Mountain Junior/Senior High School, Saxton, Pennsylvania, United States